Pingtung City (Hokkien POJ: Pîn-tong-chhī) is a county-administered city and the county seat of Pingtung County, Taiwan.

History
The area of modern-day Pingtung City was originally a village of the Taiwanese Plains Aborigines which they called "Akau", which means "the forest". After the expulsion of the Dutch, the village grew into a Chinese market-town called "A-kau".

Empire of Japan
In 1901, during the Japanese era,  was one of twenty local administrative offices established. In 1933, the town was upgraded to City status.

Republic of China
After the handover of Taiwan to the Republic of China from Japan on 25 October 1945, Pingtung City was established as a provincial city of Taiwan Province in December the same year. On 1 December 1951, it was downgraded to a county-administered city of Pingtung County and has been administered as such since that time.

Geography
Pingtung City is located in northwestern Pingtung County. It is centered between the western coast and the eastern mountain range on the Pingtung Plain. Many residents work in Kaohsiung and commute daily by train.

Climate
Pingtung City is located within the tropics and has a tropical monsoon climate. The warmest month is July and the coldest month is January. The warm season lasts from mid March to late November with an average daytime temperature of over 30 degrees Celsius. The short cooler season starts in mid December and lasts until late February, and features relatively warm days and cool nights with temperatures ranging from 15-27 degrees Celsius. Pingtung County is the hottest county in Taiwan and Pingtung City is well-known for high daytime temperatures year round.

Administrative divisions

The city is administered as 79 villages: Anle, Anzeng, Beishi, Beixing, Bixin, Chonglan, Chongli, Chongwu, Chongzhi, Dahu, Dalian, Dapu, Datong, Dawu, Dazhou, Dingliu, Dingzhai, Duanzheng, Fengrong, Fengtian, Fengyuan, Fufeng, Gongguan, Goumei, Guanghua, Guangrong, Guangxing, Guixin, Haifeng, Hexing, Housheng, Huashan, Hunan, Huxi, Jianguo, Jinquan, Kongxiang, Lingyun, Longhua, Mingzheng, Minquan, Nanshu, Pengcheng, Pinghe, Qianjin, Qiaobei, Qiaonan, Qingchun, Qingxi, Renai, Renyi, Ruiguang, Sanshan, Shengfeng, Shengli, Siwen, Taian, Taiping, Tanqi, Wannian, Weixin, Wenming, Wumiao, Xingle, Xinhe, Xinsheng, Xinxing, Yixin, Yiyong, Yongan, Yongchang, Yongcheng, Yongguang, Yongshun, Yucheng, Zeren, Zhangan, Zhangchun and Zhongzheng.

Government institutions

 Pingtung County Government
 Pingtung County Council

Education
 National Pingtung University
 National Pingtung Senior High School
國立屏東女中 National Pingtung Girls' Senior High School
國立屏東高工 National Pingtung Industrial Vocational Senior High School
縣立大同中學 Pingtung County Tah-Tung Senior High School
私立屏榮高中 Private Ping-Jung High School
私立陸興中學 Private Loo-Hsing High School
私立華洲工家職業學校 Private Hua-Chou Senior Industrial & Domestic Science Vocational School
私立民生家商職業學校 Private Minsheng Economics & Commercial Vocational High School

Tourist attractions
 Pingtung Art Museum
 Pingtung Baseball Field
 Pingtung Performing Arts Center
 Pingtung Tutorial Academy
 Zhong-Sheng-Gong Memorial

Transportation

Rail

Taiwan Railways Administration
Guilai railway station
Liukuaicuo railway station
Pingtung railway station

Taiwan High Speed Rail
There is no high speed rail station in Pingtung. The nearest high speed rail station is Zuoying, which is accessible by regular rail services from Pingtung.

Bus
Pingtung Bus (屏東客運), UBus (統聯客運) and Kuo-Kuang Bus operate services from Pingtung Bus station near Pingtung Rail Station.

Notable people from Pingtung City
 Fu-Te Ni, baseball player
 Hope Lin, actress
 Pan Wei-lun, baseball player
 Su Tseng-chang, Premier of the Republic of China
 Ang Lee, director of Brokeback Mountain, Crouching Tiger Hidden Dragon, Life of Pi
 Ella Chen, singer and actress
 Shino Lin, singer and actress

References

Bibliography

External links

 Website of Pingtung City Office
 

County-administered cities of Taiwan
Populated places in Pingtung County